The 1981–82 Rudé Právo Cup was the fourth edition of the Rudé Právo Cup ice hockey tournament. It was played in stages from August 12, 1981, to April 4, 1982. Four teams participated in the tournament, which was won by the Soviet Union.

Tournament

Results

Final standings

References

External links
Tournament on hockeyarchives.info

1981
1981–82 in Soviet ice hockey
1981–82 in Czechoslovak ice hockey
1981–82 in Swedish ice hockey
1981–82 in Finnish ice hockey
1981
1981
1981